South Carolina Highway 116 (SC 116) is a  state highway located entirely within Beaufort County, South Carolina, in the southern part of the U.S. state of South Carolina. Also known locally as Laurel Bay Road, SC 116 connects the Laurel Bay military housing development with the Marine Corps Air Station Beaufort (MCAS Beaufort) facility.

Route description
SC 116 runs in a west-to-east direction and is primarily a two-lane road.  Beginning from the guardhouse of the Laurel Bay military housing complex, the road is a four-lane divided highway. After it intersects Joe Frazier Road it narrows to a two-lane undivided road. SC 116 passes a couple of businesses whilst the rest of the surroundings is mostly woods. The west half of the highway is in the census designated place (CDP) of Laurel Bay, much of the east half's eastbound lane is in the CDP of Burton, and a small portion of the road briefly passes within the city limits of Beaufort. Just before reaching MCAS Beaufort, SC 116 widens to a four-lane divided highway again and ends at an intersection with U.S. Route 21 (US 21) on the border of the Beaufort.

Major Intersections

See also

References

External links

SC 116 at Virginia Highways' South Carolina Highways Annex

116
Transportation in Beaufort County, South Carolina